Neochloris is a genus of green algae in the family Neochloridaceae.

References

Sphaeropleales genera
Sphaeropleales